Döwran Orazalyýew (14 Oktober 1993) is a Turkmen professional footballer who plays for FC Ashgabat and Turkmenistan as midfielder.

International career
Orazalyýew made his senior debut for Turkmenistan against Romania on 27 January 2012. He was included in Turkmenistan's squad for the 2019 AFC Asian Cup in the United Arab Emirates.

Career statistics

International
Statistics accurate as of match played 27 January 2012

References

External links 
 
 

1993 births
Living people
Turkmenistan footballers
Association football defenders
Turkmenistan international footballers
FC Ahal players
2019 AFC Asian Cup players